Morro do Capão Doce is a hill in southern Brazil located between the states of Paraná and Santa Catarina. Its drainage basins include the Paraná, Rio de la Plata and the Atlantic Ocean.

References

Hills of Brazil
Landforms of Paraná (state)
Landforms of Santa Catarina (state)